Hamadi Bousbiaâ (died 4 December 2022) was a Tunisian businessman and football personality.

Biography
During his mandates, the omnisport club was champion of the Tunisian Handball League, the Tunisian Women's Handball League twice, the Tunisian Handball Cup, Tunisian Women's Handball Cup, the Tunisian Men's Volleyball League, Tunisian Women's Volleyball League, Tunisian Women's Volleyball Cup, the Women's African Volleyball Clubs Championship, and the Arab Volleyball Clubs Championship.

Hamadi Bousbiaâ died on 4 December 2022.

References

1930s births
2022 deaths
Tunisian businesspeople
People from Tunis
Association football executives